Hans Dahl (8 April 1900 – 16 June 1977) was a Norwegian footballer. He played in five matches for the Norway national football team from 1924 to 1925.

References

External links
 
 

1900 births
1977 deaths
Norwegian footballers
Norway international footballers
Footballers from Oslo
Association football forwards
Frigg Oslo FK players